Cholpon-Ata (Çolpon-Ata, چولپون-اتا, pronounced , literally "Venus-father", the name of a mythological protecting spirit) is a resort town on the northern shore of Lake Issyk-Kul in Kyrgyzstan with a population of 14,237 (2021). It is the administrative center of the Issyk-Kul District of Issyk-Kul Region; this district occupies most of the lake's north shore. To the west along highway A363 is Tamchy and to the east, Bosteri.

The town contains numerous large and small sanatoria, hotels and guesthouses to accommodate the many visitors who descend upon the lake in summer. During the Soviet era it was much frequented by vacationers brought here in organized mass tours from other parts of the USSR. Holidaymakers now usually visit on their own or in small groups and originate mainly from Kyrgyzstan, Kazakhstan and Uzbekistan. Attracting more demanding foreign tourists will require substantial upgrading of the existing facilities, but the location is certainly attractive. The view of the imposing alpine ranges of the Tian Shan across the lake is impressive. There is a local museum and an open-air site with about 2000 petroglyphs dating from 800 BC to 1200AD.

The first three World Nomad Games were held in Cholpon-Ata, in 2014, 2016, and 2018.

Population

Transportation
The city is served by Cholpon-Ata Airport, with flights on one commercial airline.

References

External links

 Image gallery of Cholpon-Ata
 Image gallery of the Ruh Ordo Cultural Center

Populated places in Issyk-Kul Region
Rock art in Asia